Jia Qinglin (born 13 March 1940) is a retired senior leader of the People's Republic of China and of the ruling Chinese Communist Party (CCP). He was a member of the CCP's Politburo Standing Committee, the party's highest ruling organ, between 2002 and 2012, and Chairman of the National Committee of the People's Political Consultative Conference between 2003 and 2013. Jia's functions as the head of China's consultative legislative body were largely ceremonial in nature.

Jia, an engineer by trade, began his political career in Fujian in 1985. There, he rose steadily through the ranks and led the province during the Yuanhua scandal. In 1996, Jia was transferred to become mayor, then party chief of Beijing. Largely due to his patronage relationship with then General Secretary Jiang Zemin, Jia was promoted to the Politburo in 1997, and remained a mainstay figure in China's political elite for the next fifteen years. He retired in 2013.

Political career 

Jia Qinglin was born in March 13. 1940 in rural Jiaohe County (now Botou), Hebei, to an ordinary family of farmers. Owing to his academic ability, he was admitted to the Shijiazhuang Industrial Management School and majored in industrial enterprise planning. Starting in 1958, he began studying electrical motor and appliance design and manufacturing at the Hebei Institute of Technology (now Hebei University of Technology). After graduating in 1962, he was assigned a technician position at the First Machine-Building Ministry and became involved in the Communist Youth League.

During the Cultural Revolution, Jia joined his educated contemporaries to perform manual labor at the May 7 Cadre School at the First Machine Building Ministry in Fengxin County, Jiangxi Province. In 1971, he began work at the Policy Research Office of the First Machine-Building Industry Ministry. In 1973, he was promoted to chief of the product management bureau of the First Ministry of Machine-building Industry. In 1978, he was named general manager of the China National Machinery and Equipment Import and Export Corporation. In 1983, he became director of Taiyuan Heavy Machinery Plant and its party secretary.

As part of wider national efforts by the Communist Party to make officials across the country more youthful and educated, in 1985, Jia made his foray into regional politics, being admitted to the Fujian provincial party standing committee and serving as deputy party secretary. He later also took on the concurrent role as head of party organization in Fujian. In 1990, he was promoted to acting governor, confirmed in 1991. In 1993, Jia was promoted to Communist Party Secretary of Fujian, the top office in the coastal province.

Sometime during the 1990s, Jia gained the confidence of then-General Secretary Jiang Zemin, with whom he developed a patron-client relationship. Jia was transferred to Beijing in 1996 to serve as mayor, and in 1997 was promoted to the position of party secretary, helping Jiang consolidate the city's political landscape after Chen Xitong was ousted on corruption charges. As Beijing party chief, Jia became a member of the Communist Party's ruling Politburo. He also came onto the national and international spotlight during the 50th Anniversary celebrations of the People's Republic of China as the event's master of ceremonies, reading prepared lines atop the Tiananmen Gate to millions of onlookers and television audiences.

At the national level 
Because of his high local position and his ties to Jiang, in November 2002 Jia was named to the 16th Politburo Standing Committee (PSC) of the Chinese Communist Party. Although his ceremonial role as the Chairman of the Chinese People's Political Consultative Conference, a quasi-consultative upper house in China's political system, made him fourth in the official order of precedence, it was widely accepted that the position carried very little power, perhaps the least powerful in the nine PSC members.  Jia Qinglin was the most senior Chinese official to attend the funeral of Zhao Ziyang.  With the transition of authority to Hu Jintao, Jia appeared to have been given the job of coordinating policy on Taiwan.

In 2007, Jia was named again to the 17th Politburo Standing Committee during the 17th Party Congress. Prior to the congress, it was speculated that Jia may be thrown out of the running due to his tainted record as the party chief of Fujian during the Yuanhua scandal. However, largely owing to the backing of Jiang Zemin, Jia was able to remain on the body for one more term.

Jia exited from the Politburo Standing Committee in 2012 after reaching retirement age. He retired from politics for good in March 2013, when he relinquished his CPPCC post on schedule to Yu Zhengsheng. Jia continued to make public appearances in retirement. On 5 September 2015, Jia appeared at the China Victory Day Parade. On 21 December 2015, Jia visited Liancheng County in Fujian. In June 2016, Jia attended a science and innovation exhibition at the Beijing Exhibition Center. In October 2016, Jia showed up at the World Robot Conference in Beijing. On 17 May 2017, Jia met with Hebei University of Technology alumni at Zhongnanhai.

The financial dealings of Jia's granddaughter Jasmine Li and son-in-law Li Pak-tam were reported on by media during the Panama Papers scandal; Jasmine had been featured on Chinese tabloids for appearing at a Hotel de Crillon debutante ball in Paris in 2009 wearing a Carolina Herrera designer gown.

See also 

 Politics of the People's Republic of China
 Shanghai clique

References

External links 
 Jia Qinglin biography @ China Vitae

1940 births
Living people
Governors of Fujian
Chinese Communist Party politicians from Hebei
Mayors of Beijing
Politicians from Cangzhou
Hebei University of Technology alumni
People's Republic of China politicians from Hebei
Chairpersons of the National Committee of the Chinese People's Political Consultative Conference
Delegates to the 8th National People's Congress
Delegates to the 9th National People's Congress
Delegates to the 10th National People's Congress
Delegates to the 11th National People's Congress
Members of the 17th Politburo Standing Committee of the Chinese Communist Party
Members of the 16th Politburo Standing Committee of the Chinese Communist Party
Members of the 15th Politburo of the Chinese Communist Party
People from Botou